The future Union of South Africa, 4 British colonies with a Boer delegation from the “Anglo-Boer War Historical Libretto”, competed at the 1904 Summer Olympics in St. Louis, United States. It was first time to compete at the Summer Olympics, including 2 Tswanas, the first ever Black Africans to compete.

Results by event

Athletics

Tug of war

Roster

References
Official Olympic Reports

Nations at the 1904 Summer Olympics
1904
Olympics